The Bay is American crime-drama series. The show streams on Peacock in the United States, 10 Play in Australia, SABC in South Africa and Planet TV in Europe.

Starring Kristos Andrews as the rugged and protective "golden boy" Pete Garrett, and Mary Beth Evans as his wealthy socialite matriarch, Sara Garrett, the series was created by Gregori J. Martin. It is set in the posh seaside town of Bay City, where the privileged residents are entangled in one scandal, betrayal or love affair after the other.

The Bay was nominated for a Digital Streaming Emmy in 2012 for Daytime Emmy Award for Outstanding Special Class Short Format Daytime, won a Daytime Emmy Award for Outstanding New Approaches Drama Series in 2015, and a Daytime Emmy Award for Outstanding Digital Daytime Drama Series in 2016, 2017, 2018, and 2020.

Plot
The Garretts rule the social set of Bay City, where passions run high, scandals run deep, and every relationship can be shockingly deadly.

Cast

Series regulars
 Kristos Andrews as Pete Garrett
 Kristos Andrews as Adam Kenway
 Karrueche Tran as Vivian Johnson 
 Eric Nelsen as Daniel Garrett 
 A Martinez as Nardo Ramos 
 Kiara Liz Ortega as Dre Collins 
 Maxwell Caulfield as Sir Thomas Kenway
 Ronn Moss as John Blackwell 
 Celeste Fianna as Tamara Garrett
 Mike Manning as Sir Thomas Kenway
 Brandon Beemer as Evan Blackwell
 Mary Beth Evans as Sara Garrett
 Alicia Leigh Willis as Avery Garrett 
 Jacklyn Zeman as Sofia Madison 
 Jade Harlow as Lianna Ramos
 Terri Ivens as Orchid 
 Tristan Rogers as Commissioner Lex Martin
 Taylor Stanley as Zoey Johnson

Guest cast

 Lilly Melgar as Janice Ramos
 Brittany Underwood as Riley Henderson
 Matthew Ashford as Steve Jensen 
 Scott Bailey as Nathan Perkins 
 Nicolas Coster as Mayor Jack Madison 
 Erik Fellows as Damian Blackwell 
 Anthony Aquilino as Det. Eddie Perrone (2011–2017)
 Dylan Bruce as Brian Nelson (2010–2012)
 Derrell Whitt as Will Campbell
 John Callahan as Detective Mackenzie Johnson #1 (2010)
 Lane Davies as Detective Mackenzie Johnson #2
 Joe Lando as Lee Nelson #1 (2010–2011)
 Paul Satterfield as Lee Nelson #2 (2011)
 Réal Andrews as Dr. Keith Campbell (2010–2014)
 Thor Knai as Matthew Johnson #1 (2010–2014)
 Rib Hillis as Matthew Johnson #2 (2012)
 Martha Madison as Marly Nelson-Foster (2010–2014)
 Sandra Dee Robinson as Christine Nelson (2010–2014)
 Tanisha Lynn as Vivian Johnson (2010–2011)
 Daphne Bloomer as Colleen Givens (2010–2011)
 Gavin Houston as Tony Foster (2010–2014)
 Charles Shaughnessy as Captain Elliot Sanders (2010–2014)
 Camden Toy as Igor Chambers (2010–2014)
 Brody Hutzler as Press Secretary Kenneth Allen #1 (2011–2012)
 Sean Kanan as Press Secretary Kenneth Allen #2 (2014)
 Jed Allan as Harold Johnson (2011–2012)
 Anna Kathryn Holbrook as Carol Andrews (2011)
 Agim Kaba as Noah Andrews (2011)
 Cherie Johnson as Carlina Hall (2011)
 Ilene Kristen as Liza Garrett (2011–2016)
 Ignacio Serricchio as Manny Ramos (2011–2014)
 Kimberlin Brown as Dr. Grace Drum (2011)
 Vincent De Paul as Father Leone (2011–2016)
 Tonja Walker as Ms. St. John (2011)
 Marie Wilson as Claire Andrews (2011)
 Michael O'Leary as Michael Donovan (2011)
 Miriam Colon as Grandma Andrews (2011)
 Massi Furlan as Anton (2012)
 Fiona Hutchison as Emma Cambridge (2012)
 Michael Swan as Buck Stanton (2012)
 Brian Gaskill as Chase Walker (2012–2014)
 John Reilly as Mortimer (2012)
 Celeste Fianna as Tamara Garrett (2012–2016)
 Bill Cobbs as Boyd Bloom (2014)
 Patrika Darbo as Mickey Walker (2014–2017)
 Bruce Davison as Red Garrett (2014–2017)
 Kiko Ellsworth as Kinyata Foster (2014)
 Judi Evans as Katherine Blackwell (2014)
 Lindsay Hartley as Sammy Sullivan (2014)
 Kate Linder as Rita Buxton (2014)
 Kira Reed Lorsch as Jo Conners (2014–2016)
 A Martinez as Nardo Ramos (2014-2017)
 Eric Martsolf as Young Lee Nelson (2014–2016)
 Judith McConnell as Melody Garrett (2014–2017)
 Jared Safier as James the Butler (2014–2017)
 Jason-Shane Scott as Brad (2014–2017)
 Victoria Rowell as Iris Hopkins (2017)
 Jensen Buchanan (2017)
 Carolyn Hennesy as Karen Blackwell (2017)
 Brandon Beemer as Evan Blackwell / Young John (flashback) (2016)

Episodes

Casting
Created by Martin, The Bay was announced in May 2010, with Tristan Rogers, Lilly Melgar, John Callahan and Sandra Robinson attached to star. Days later, We Love Soaps reported that Mary Beth Evans had been cast as the lead female, Sara Garrett. Matthew Ashford was added in July as Steve Jensen, Sara's rapist and the father of her eldest child, Brian. By August 2010, Dylan Bruce had been cast as Brian, and Martha Madison as Sara's daughter Marly. Around the same time, Rogers' character was identified as Police Commissioner Lex Martin, who shares a past with Sara, and Melgar was noted to be playing Janice Ramos, Sara's fiery nemesis.

From the beginning, the series has featured many notable American film and television actors in its regular and guest cast. In 2011, Evans and her character Sara made a crossover appearance on the web series Pretty.

Production and broadcast
Martin executive produces with Wendy Riche and Kristos Andrews, who also stars as Sara's son, Pete Garrett.

Premiering at Blip.tv on September 15, 2010, the first season included four "chapters" of four episodes each, as well as an eight-episode Summer Special 2011 called Far From The Bay. In February 2011, Jim Romanovich of Associated Television International announced plans to repackage the series into 30-minute episodes and pitch it to cable networks and key local TV stations.

Season 2 premiered on October 27, 2011, again comprising 16 episodes in four chapters, as well as an eight-episode Thanksgiving Special called HoliBays, and a five-episode Summer Special 2012 called Darkside of The Bay. In August 2013, Blip.tv was acquired by Maker Studios.

Season 3 premiered on December 5, 2013. Maker Studios shut down Blip.tv on August 20, 2015, and redirected it to Maker.tv.

In September 2015, Martin announced eight new installments for a forthcoming season 4. The fourth season premiered on Vimeo on December 1, 2015, with the eighth episode airing on December 22. Production resumed in May 2016 on the final six episodes of the season. The Bay is available for streaming in a limited capacity at thebaytheseries.com.

Amazon Prime
In April 2015, Soap Opera Digest reported that episodes of The Bay would be re-released on Amazon Prime in summer 2016 as two 14-episode seasons. According to Martin, they will be "remastered episodes with never before seen footage, [and] the show will have a new starting point". A 14-episode first season was made available for streaming starting September 6, 2016. A second season of 14 digitally remastered episodes including "brand-new, never-before-seen episodes" was released on November 29, 2016. Wendy Riche joined the production as a writer for the Amazon season 2, becoming an executive producer for the second half of the season. A third season is in production with Martin, Andrews, and Riche as executive producers and set for release in spring 2017.

Reception
In December 2010, Martin was named by We Love Soaps as one of the 15 Most Fascinating People of 2010 for his work on the series. Michael Logan of TV Guide noted The Bay "terrific reviews" in 2011. Writing for Entertainment Weekly, Alina Adams named the series one of the "4 best soap operas on the web" in 2015.

Awards and recognition
The Bay won a 2015 Daytime Emmy Award for Outstanding New Approaches Drama Series. Along with Martin and Andrews as executive producers, the winning team included Supervising Producer Nadine Aronson, Coordinating Producer Carol C. Hedgepeth and producers Anthony Aquilino, Braxton Davis, Devin DeVasquez, Mary Beth Evans, Celeste Fianna, Jade Harlow, Lilly Melgar, Ronn Moss, Eric Nelsen, Sainty Nelsen, Jared Safier, Derrell Whitt, Salvatore V. Zannino The series was previously nominated in 2012 for Outstanding Special Class Short Format Daytime.

In 2016, The Bay received a Daytime Emmy nomination for Outstanding Digital Daytime Drama Series. Mary Beth Evans, Lilly Melgar and Patsy Pease were nominated for Outstanding Actress in a Digital Daytime Drama Series for their roles, and Kristos Andrews was nominated for Outstanding Actor in a Digital Daytime Drama Series. The Bay won for Outstanding Digital Series, and Evans and Andrews won in the performer categories. The Bay was nominated for Outstanding Digital Daytime Drama Series again in 2017, with Evans and Melgar nominated in the renamed category Outstanding Lead Actress in a Digital Daytime Drama Series and Andrews nominated in the renamed Outstanding Lead Actor in a Digital Daytime Drama Series. Carolyn Hennesy, Jade Harlow, and Kym Whitley were nominated in the newly created category Outstanding Supporting or Guest Actress in a Digital Daytime Drama Series, and Nicolas Coster, Matthew Ashford, and Ronn Moss were nominated in the newly created category Outstanding Supporting or Guest Actor in a Digital Daytime Drama Series. The Bay won Outstanding Digital Series, and swept the performer categories with wins for Evans, Andrews, Hennesy, and Coster. The series earned 15 nominations in 2018, winning Outstanding Digital Daytime Drama Series, and Outstanding Directing in a Digital Drama Series, as well as performer Emmys for Andrews (Outstanding Lead Actor in a Digital Drama Series), Harlow (Outstanding Supporting Actress in a Digital Daytime Drama Series), Eric Nelsen (Outstanding Supporting Actor in a Digital Daytime Drama Series), and Patrika Darbo (Outstanding Guest Performer in a Digital Daytime Drama Series). Darbo's award was later revoked due to a submission error.

To date, the series has won 11 Indie Series Awards, and has been nominated for several more. In 2017, the series earned a record 21 Indie Series Award nominations.

References

External links
 
 
 
 

2010s American drama television series
2010 web series debuts
2010s American LGBT-related drama television series
American drama web series
Internet soap operas
American LGBT-related web series
Daytime Emmy Award for Outstanding Digital Daytime Drama Series winners